Alexandre Edílson de Freitas (born 16 July 1976) is a Brazilian former professional footballer who played as a centre-back.

Playing career
Alexandre de Freitas spent his European career at FC Aarau of Swiss Super League, SV Darmstadt 98 of Regionalliga, FC Baden and YF Juventus of Swiss Challenge League, FC Rapperswil-Jona and Chur 97 of 1. Liga.

Coaching career
Alexandre de Freitas retired in the summer 2014 and was hired as an assistant coach for his last club, SC Brühl SG. On 22 October 2018, he was appointed interim head coach following the departure of Uwe Wegmann. He was in charge for three games, losing all of them, before being replaced in the beginning of November 2018 and then continued in his old position as an assistant coach. As of May 2020, he was still working in the same position.

References

External links
 

Living people
1976 births
Brazilian footballers
Association football fullbacks
Swiss Super League players
Swiss Challenge League players
Regionalliga players
SV Darmstadt 98 players
FC Baden players
FC Aarau players
FC Chur 97 players
SC Young Fellows Juventus players
FC Kreuzlingen players
Brazilian football managers
Brazilian expatriate footballers
Brazilian expatriate sportspeople in Switzerland
Expatriate footballers in Switzerland
Brazilian expatriate sportspeople in Germany
Expatriate footballers in Germany